Alternaria cucumerina is a plant pathogen.

References

External links
 Index Fungorum
 USDA ARS Fungal Database

cucumerina
Fungal plant pathogens and diseases
Fungi described in 1895